Nathan Rourke (born May 24, 1998) is a Canadian professional football quarterback for the Jacksonville Jaguars of the National Football League (NFL). He previously played for the BC Lions of the Canadian Football League (CFL). Rourke played college football for the Ohio Bobcats. Rourke set the all-time CFL records completion percentage (79.2%) during the 2022 CFL season.

Early years
Rourke was born in Victoria, British Columbia but grew up in Oakville, Ontario.  He played minor football for the Burlington Stampeders before playing for three years at Holy Trinity Catholic Secondary School in Oakville. He transferred to Edgewood Academy in Elmore, Alabama, for his senior season of high school football. After his grade 12 season, he committed to play college football at Fort Scott Community College in Fort Scott, Kansas.

College career
Rourke spent one season at Fort Scott, where he was named first-team All-KJCCC. He then transferred to Ohio University, where he started at quarterback for three years for the Bobcats. Rourke led Ohio to a 25–14 overall record as a starting quarterback for the Bobcats, while leading the team to three consecutive bowl victories in the 2017 Bahamas Bowl, 2018 Frisco Bowl, and the 2020 Famous Idaho Potato Bowl (January).

He was the first winner of the Jon Cornish Trophy as the top Canadian football player in the NCAA for 2017, and repeated as winner in 2018. Growing up, Rourke idolized Green Bay Packers quarterback Brett Favre.

Collegiate statistics

Professional career

BC Lions 
Rourke was ranked as the seventh-overall prospect entering the 2020 CFL Draft; after being ranked third overall in both September 2019 and December 2019. He was eventually drafted in the second round with the 15th overall pick by the BC Lions. Rourke was the highest drafted Canadian quarterback since Jesse Palmer in the 2001 CFL Draft. However, he did not play in 2020 due to the cancellation of the 2020 CFL season. In May 2021, he tried out for the New York Giants at wide receiver.

2021 
On May 19, 2021, Rourke signed a three-year contract with the Lions. Rourke started the opening game of the 2021 season against the Saskatchewan Roughriders since Michael Reilly could not play due to a shoulder/arm injury. Rourke completed 10 of 18 passes for 194 yards with two touchdowns and two interceptions. He was replaced in the second half by Reilly, but Rourke finished the game for the Lions. He spent most of the 2021 season as the backup for Reilly and being used in short yardage situations. Rourke also started the final game of the regular season on November 19, 2021, where he completed 23 out of 34 pass attempts for 359 yards, one touchdown, and two interceptions. He also had seven rush attempts for 34 yards with three touchdowns as he earned his first career win as a starter in the victory over the Edmonton Elks.

2022 
Rourke made his 2022 CFL season debut as the starting quarterback for the BC Lions on June 11, 2022, where he went 26/29 for 282 yards and three passing touchdowns. He also had seven carries for 78 yards and two touchdowns leading his team to a 59-15 victory over the Edmonton Elks. On June 25, 2022, Rourke set the record for most passing yards by a Canadian quarterback in a CFL game with 436 against the Toronto Argonauts. He also set a Lions club record that night for pass completions in a single game with 39, breaking Buck Pierce's previous record of 38. On August 6, 2022, he broke his own record for passing yards by a Canadian when he threw for 477 yards against the Elks and also threw a career high five touchdown passes. In that same game, he completed 34 out of 37 pass attempts (91.9%) to record the highest pass completion rate in a single game with a minimum of 30 attempts and the third-highest completion percentage with a minimum of 20 attempts. In the following game, on August 14, 2022, Rourke again set a new mark for passing yards by a Canadian with 488 yards and tied his own Lions franchise record with 39 completions in the comeback victory over the Calgary Stampeders. Unfortunately, on August 19, 2022 Rourke left a game against the Saskatchewan Roughriders with a foot injury. A couple of days later it was determined that he suffered a Lisfranc sprain in his right foot and required surgery. At the time the Lions' organization was hopeful he would be able to return for the end of the regular season or playoffs. The 2022 season was a breakout campaign for Nathan Rourke as he was named a Top Performer of the Week in the CFL five times in the Lions' first nine games of the season. He was also named a CFL Top Performers of the Month for the months of June and August. Through the first half of the season Rourke was a leading candidate for the Most Outstanding Player and Most Outstanding Canadian awards. He was leading the league in passing attempts, completions, completion percentage, passing yards, yards per attempt, passing touchdowns, and quarterback rating. He was also second in the league with seven rushing touchdowns. Rourke returned to practice on October 11, 2022. It was announced that Rourke would return to the starting lineup for the team's final game of the regular season. He ended the season leading the league in passer efficiency, completion percentage and yards per game. His mark of 78.7% set a new CFL record for the highest completion percentage in a single season in league history. After besting the Stampeders in the first round of the playoffs Rourke and the Lions were defeated by the two-time defending champion Winnipeg Blue Bombers in the Western Final.  In spite of missing close to half of the regular season, he won the CFL's award for Most Outstanding Canadian.

NFL workouts 
Following his breakout season in the CFL Rourke announced that he had scheduled workouts with a number of National Football League (NFL) teams. In December Rourke had workouts with seven NFL teams; including: the Las Vegas Raiders, Jacksonville Jaguars, Denver Broncos, Indianapolis Colts, Tampa Bay Buccaneers, Arizona Cardinals and Minnesota Vikings. In January 2023 Rourke had workouts with five more NFL teams; Cincinnati Bengals, Kansas City Chiefs, Los Angeles Chargers, New York Giants, and Cleveland Browns. As per CFL-NFL transfer window rules he was eligible to sign an NFL contract starting on January 9, 2023.

Jacksonville Jaguars 
On January 16, 2023, it was officially announced that Rourke had signed a three-year contract with the Jacksonville Jaguars of the NFL.

Professional statistics

Personal life
He was born to Larry and Robin Rourke. His younger brother, Kurtis Rourke, plays quarterback for the Ohio Bobcats football team.

Rourke is a Christian.

References

External links
 
BC Lions bio
Ohio Bobcats bio

1998 births
Living people
Players of Canadian football from British Columbia
Sportspeople from Victoria, British Columbia
Ohio Bobcats football players
American football quarterbacks
Canadian players of American football
Fort Scott Greyhounds football players
BC Lions players
Jacksonville Jaguars players
Jon Cornish Trophy winners
Canadian Football League Most Outstanding Canadian Award winners